Plachy-Buyon is a commune in the Somme department in Hauts-de-France in northern France.

Geography
It is heavily influenced by the proximity of Amiens.
28% of the inhabitants are under the age of twenty.

Population

Places of interest
 The new mairie, inaugurated on 14 October 2006.
 The old paper mill. Built around 1838–1844, on the site of an old watermill.
 Protected wooded valley site.
 The nineteenth century church of Saint-Martin.
 Traces of two Gallo-Roman villas.

See also
Communes of the Somme department

References

Communes of Somme (department)